The Awareness League (AL) was a Nigerian anarchist organization active since 1991 to 1999. The Awareness League has gone through several periods of repression, making its own organizational efforts and continuity sporadic, as well as communications with the rest of the anarchist movement. AL was known to be anarcho-syndicalist in orientation, having joined the IWA–AIT at its Madrid congress in December, 1996.

The membership of the AL was primarily students, professors, university teachers, journalists, and other activists on the Nigerian left. Its militants have been active in several public service strikes.

Sam Mbah, author of African Anarchism: History of a Movement (along with co-author I.E. Igariwey), was an active member in AL.

Background 
The Awareness League was a group founded in the 1990s in Nigeria. It was officially founded in 1989 and was active till 1999. The Awareness League was anarcho-syndicalist in nature and was founded mostly in response to the military rule in Nigeria. Further, this group was heavily run by students, recent college graduates, professors and general activists meaning that the writings and teachings of Karl Marx were very influential in the group's founding ideology. Notably, Nigerian author, lawyer, anarchist and activist Sam Mbah played an important role in the founding and functioning of the organization. In 1996 the group joined the International Workers Association at their conference in Madrid. With the ending of military rule and the coming of civilian rule in 1999, the Awareness League became very fragmented and for the most part lost its prominence.

Formation 
The group was officially formed in 1989 by Sam Mbah and other like minded individuals following their graduation from university in Nigeria in the 1980’s. The Awareness League, at its height, had over 1000 members. However, this group began in the mid 1980’s at the University of Nigeria Nsukka, as a study group. However, as is discussed in further detail, the group would officially form in the late 1980’s following the collapse of the Soviet Union and the convergence of many other like minded individuals.

While spending time at the University of Lagos, Sam and others came into contact with socialist groups along with Marxist teachings. As Sam Mbah said in an interview, “we became attracted to Marxism, in the sense that it preached the coming of a new dawn in society, and by extension, the African continent. We were really enthralled by the perspectives of Marxism, and the abiding, thorough critique of capitalism that Marx and Marxist literature embodied”. Sam and others quickly embraced the Marxist theories and would go on to identify themselves as marxists both while at school and following graduation.

In Nigeria, following graduation there is a mandatory one year of national service that must be completed. While serving, Sah Mbah met other young Nigerians with similar values and they began to organize and discuss Marx and his teachings. Eventually, they became aware of a newspaper in New York, ‘The Torch’, which exposed the young group to anarchism. During this time, the Soviet Union and communism in Europe began to collapse and as a result, socialism and communism were put into a crisis. As a result, the young leaders of the eventual Awareness League became increasingly charmed by anarchism. These young anarchists wanted a platform that would be able to have a lasting impact, and as a result, they formed the Awareness League. The intersection of young academics at this military led to an increase in the size and number of participants in the Awareness League that first began as a study group back in the mid 1980’s. This coupled with the collapse of Communism, and a strong interest in anarchism due to “The Torch’, and a lack of a clear ideology in the group, led to the official formation of the Awareness League.

The members of the resulting Awareness League tended to be similar in background as Mbah. As noted in an interview with the group by Germany's Free Workers Union, “Our members are principally university and polytechnic lecturers, journalists, students, civil-service employees, and other activists of leftist persuasion”. These members formed the group under the categorization of a social libertarian organization committed to the ideals of revolutionary socialism and anarcho-syndicalism. Further, Sam Mbah noted that the group was also formed mostly in resistance to the military rule that dominated Nigeria during the time period.

In the Awareness League constitution, the group outlines their purpose, objectives and organizational structure. It also speaks to the role that the current global capitalist system played in influencing their formation. The group notes that, “the imperative for sustained struggle against the forces of capitalism has never been greater”. Specifically, they write that the negative effects that come along with capitalism affect underdeveloped and third world countries more so than in other nations. Their critique of capitalism goes on to express ideas similar to those of Karl Marx, specifically when dealing with the modes of production and social classes. The constitution contains the line, “At every point in time, the dominant class in society seeks to exploit its access to the means of production to appropriate a disproportionate value of social production to the benefit of its membership whose prerogative it is also, to decide what is to be produced, how and when”. The group acknowledges the shortcomings of capitalism and these shortcomings also play an important role in their formation as can be seen in their constitution.

Purpose and Objective 
The group’s primary objective was the end of class struggle. Which they believed to be perpetuated by the current state system. The Awareness League advocated for the abolition of structures, institutions, and political systems within such a state system, driven by the belief that national boundaries and territoriality are fake creations. Instead, the group pushed for the adoption of “self-managing, self-governing and self-accounting units organized along the lines of Libertarian communism”. These new governing ideals would promote equality and free will and do not include the exercise of state power in any manner. Specifically, the group noted there will be no imposition of a dictatorship of the proletariat. Further, the group was resolute that land ownership must be reconfigured should this move be successful. There needed to be a great and radical redistribution so that the means of production, the facilities and resources for producing goods, could be reallocated.

Another key aspect of the group's objectives was the education of the masses, that is all working peoples. This objective was derived from the goal of spreading revolutionary syndicalism which they argued could not happen without first educating the people and enchanting their consciousness.  

While pursuing these objectives, the group set out guidelines stating what is and what is not to be accepted. Recognizing that it would be difficult to achieve such goals single handedly, the group said they may, “forge alliances, seek collaboration and working agreements with other leftists and leftist organizations, anti-war movements as well as human rights activists, groups and mass organizations”. In addition to this, the group advocated for boycotts, sit-ins and strikes to be organized and sanctioned by members. The Awareness League committed themselves to peace while rejecting war, militarism, fascism and racism. The group advocated for violence, “only as a form of resistance to the violence and violent methods and tactics of the ruling class, its agencies and collaborators''. The group also made it clear that no form of communication could occur between the ruling classes, the exploiters, and the masses.

Membership 
The group opened membership to all peoples. Membership is not dictated by country, gender, race, or age. The only requirement was a clear commitment to the objectives and purposes of the group and subsequently, the goals and motivations behind revolutionary syndicalism. However, the group did divide membership into three different categories, Student membership, Associate Membership, and Full Membership.

Student Membership was open to students of high schools, secondary schools and Universities. Student members did not have to pay dues.

Associate Membership is for those who “share in the goals and aspirations of revolutionary socialism” but for some reason, whether it be the nature of their work or places of residence, cannot actively participate in the day-to-day activities of the Awareness League.

Full membership, the most complete form of membership that is open to all “activists of revolutionary socialism and anarcho-syndicalism” and those in this membership receive all rights and privileges that come with being associated with the Awareness League.

Structure 
The Awareness League in its charter said to have an Annual Conference once a year to review the actions taken by the league as well as elect the officers of the group. All members that pay dues are able to vote and attend and decisions are made by a majority vote. The dues payment referenced above refers to a one time annual payment made by members that helps to fund the activities of the League.

The group will also form a committee, the Central Working Committee. The Central Working Committee is composed of the principal officers of the group as well as 5 “ex-officio member” who get elected at the Annual Conference mentioned above. This committee would meet four times a year to discuss the ideological and political education among other things.

Officers 
The Awareness League divides leadership into four main positions, the positions are known as the Principal Officers and they oversee the general direction and functioning of the group. The four positions that can be held are as follows: National coordinator, Secretary- General, Financial Secretary and Assistant Secretary.

The National Coordinator is the primary spokesperson for the organization and is generally in charge of representing the group, whether that be with the public or other organizations.

The Secretary-General’s main contribution is to produce publications and engage in research and writing of articles.

The Financial Secretary is in charge of the financial records of the Awareness League and the Assistant Secretary helps the Secretary- General research and write publications and articles. 

The Secretary General and Assistant Secretary publish articles in The Revolutionary, the groups internal publication, as well as other sporadic articles and education materials throughout the year.

Collaboration with other Organizations 
The Awareness League was open to collaboration between other organizations with similar goals, objectives and ideologies. In particular, the Awareness League collaborated with the human rights group Campaign for Democracy. In addition, the group belonged to the Left Coalition, an emerging body in Nigeria during the 1990’s. They also hoped to establish connections with other anarchist groups throughout Africa.

Notable Years

1989 
The group is officially chartered.

1992 
In May 1992, 4 members of the Awareness League, including the General Secretary, were arrested during a series of popular protests which swept the country. These four that were arrested were, James Ndubisi (the General Secretary), Garba Audu, Kingsley Etioni and Chuks Udemba. The four members were arrested in the town of Enugu along with over 2000 other protestors nationwide. This information was conveyed in a press release by the Workers Solidarity Alliance. The release states that the protests which swept the nation were, “against the economic and social policies of the military dictatorship of General Babangida, and the austerity policies of the International Monetary Fund and World Bank”.  

In a press release by the WSA in October 1992, the group called for international solidarity in response to the actions taken by the military dictatorship of General Ibrahim Babangida. The arrest of their four members earlier in the year was in part what fueled this cry for international support. The group requested assistance to help pay for legal services, cater for the families of the detained activists, publicize and bring attention to the plight of the four activists and to handle other logistical problems related to the situation.

1993 
On January 29, 1993, the four prisoners that are mentioned above were officially released from prison according to a press release by the Workers' Solidarity Alliance (WSA) on the 22nd of February 1993. James Ndubisi (the General Secretary), Garba Audu, Kingsley Etioni and Chuks Udemba were released on bail under the condition that they report, weekly, to the secret police, State Security Services.  The Awareness League stated that a “fierce legal and psychological battle” would ensue, that is sufficient enough to enter them into a new stage in the struggle.

On July 6, 1993 the Awareness League fully devoted itself  to a national membership and further established the officer positions mentioned above. The group also committed to a national education campaign. At this conference the group also noted that Africa does not have the same anarchist presence that many other nations have and that, as an organization, it has a “historical responsibility” in the anarchist movement across the globe. In 1993, much occurred in Nigeria that concerned the Awareness League. First, there was great corruption and general mayhem during the presidential election as the incumbent, Babangida, refused to leave office. Further, in a letter written by the Awareness League in 1993, the group states that they have “suffered severe repression in the hands of  military junta of General Ibrahim Babangida”. Subsequently, there were great strikes and protests as the price of petrol was raised by 700%. As a result the military took power once again and, as written by the Awareness League, “A virtual State of Emergency has followed”. The Awareness League came out and openly stated its opposition to the military dictatorship and called for the return of Abiola to the presidency.

In August 1993, Sam Mbah and one other member of the Awareness League were arrested for their protests against Babaginda. At the time, Mbah was the coordinator of the Awareness League. However, the two were later released by the interim government.

1996 
The Awareness League put together two seminars/political education sessions in 1996. One at Engu and the other at the University of Nsukka. These events were shut down by police and members of the state security service as they deemed the meetings to be illegal and designed to “sabotage the transition of civil rule program of the junta”.

In July 1996, the Awareness League and three other organizations organized a peaceful protest in Ibadan in response to the arrests of many activists and journalists that had been imprisoned since November 1993.

In December 1996, the IWA secretariat in Madrid Spain sent the Awareness League a letter that official admitted the group into the IWA as the Nigerian section of the IWA. The group stated that their admission, “comes against the backdrop of on-going efforts to build a viable organization, and to propagate the concepts of libertarian socialism to an African audience” and that they would continue to count on the active support of the IWA to execute its programs.

1999 
The group began to dissolve due to the entrance of civilian government in Nigeria.

Fragmentation 
In 1999, the struggle against military rule that the Awareness League and many other groups in Nigeria took part in came to an end with the coming of civilian rule. In an interview, Sam Mbah cited the struggle against military rule as a common and uniting factor in the function of the Awareness League and other groups stating, “ the military was a uniting factor, I would say, in the sense that every person – whether you were anarchist, Marxist, leftist, socialist – saw in the military a common enemy to be resisted, to be opposed, to be overthrown if possible”. The formation of a civilian government meant there was no longer a common enemy and many individuals began to gravitate towards bourgeois politics. Additionally, Sam Mbah notes that groups such as the Awareness League were not prepared for the formation of a civilian government and assumed that it would have “business as usual” leading to many groups, including the Awareness League to become fragmented.

See also
 Anarchism in Africa

References

External links
 The Awareness League (AL) archive at RevoltLib.com
 Awareness League archive at TheAnarchistLibrary.org
 Interview with general Secretary of Awareness League, 1994

1989 establishments in Nigeria
1999 disestablishments in Nigeria
Anarchism in Nigeria
Defunct anarchist organizations in Africa
International Workers' Association
Organizations disestablished in 1999
Organizations established in 1989
Political organizations based in Nigeria